Trevor Lane (born April 26, 1994) is an American professional baseball pitcher for the Chicago Dogs of the American Association of Professional Baseball. He was drafted by the New York Yankees in the 10th round of the 2016 Major League Baseball draft.

Career
Lane attended Mount Si High School in Snoqualmie, Washington. He played for the school's baseball team as a pitcher and first baseman, and was named the Gatorade Washington Player of the Year in 2012. He enrolled at Lower Columbia College, where he played college baseball for two years, and transferred to the University of Illinois at Chicago (UIC) to play for the UIC Flames. Lane was named the top relief pitcher in the Horizon League in 2017.

New York Yankees
The New York Yankees selected Lane in the 10th round of the 2016 MLB draft. He signed and pitched for the Rookie-level GCL Yankees before being promoted to the Staten Island Yankees of the Class A-Short Season New York-Penn League. In 15.1 relief innings pitched between both teams, he went 1–0 with a 0.59 ERA. In 2017, he began the year with the Charleston RiverDogs of the Class A South Atlantic League. He also spent time with the Tampa Tarpons of the Class A-Advanced Florida State League during the year. In 37 relief appearances, he went 6–4 with a 1.52 ERA.

The Yankees invited Lane to spring training in 2018 as a non-roster player. He began the year with Tampa and was promoted in May to the Trenton Thunder of the Class AA Eastern League. Over 68 relief innings pitched between the two teams, Lane compiled a 2–4 record with a 3.97 ERA, striking out 82 batters. He returned to Trenton to begin the 2019 season, and he also spent time during the year with the Tarpons and the Scranton/Wilkes-Barre RailRiders of the Class AAA International League. Over  relief innings between the three clubs, Lane went 6–2 with a 2.05 ERA, striking out 74 batters. He did not play a minor league game in 2020 due to the cancellation of the minor league season caused by the COVID-19 pandemic.

In May 2021, Lane was named to the roster of the United States national baseball team for the Americas Qualifying Event.

Lane spent the 2021 season with Triple-A Scranton, posting a 4-0 record and 1.99 ERA with 28 strikeouts in 22.2 innings pitched. Lane was assigned to the Scranton to begin the 2022 season. After working to a 2.08 ERA with 25 strikeouts in 21.2 innings of work, he was released by the Yankees organization on July 5, 2022.

Chicago Dogs
On July 20, 2022, Lane signed with the Chicago Dogs of the American Association of Professional Baseball.

References

External links

1994 births
Living people
Baseball pitchers
Baseball players from Washington (state)
Charleston RiverDogs players
Gulf Coast Yankees players
Lower Columbia Red Devils baseball players
People from North Bend, Washington
Scranton/Wilkes-Barre RailRiders players
Staten Island Yankees players
Tampa Tarpons players
Tampa Yankees players
Trenton Thunder players
UIC Flames baseball players
United States national baseball team players